Johnnie Walker is a 1992 Indian Malayalam-language film directed by Jayaraj and written by Ranjith. Mammootty appeared in the lead along with a set of youngsters. The story centres around a middle aged man who joins the same college that his younger brother studies at.

Plot
Mammootty's character, Johnny Varghese is fondly known as Johnnie Walker because of his preference of the alcohol brand of the same name, Johnnie Walker. He has a brother Bobby Varghese who studies in Bangalore for a degree in Economics. A visit from his brother and friends changes Johnnie's mind and he joins college despite his age. From there he clashes with Swamy who rules the college with his drug gang. Because of his love towards his brother Bobby, Johnny joins his college as a student and they start living together. Soon he becomes the hero of the college as well as rival to Swamy and his gang. Bobby falls in love with his classmate Chandini, who is a depressed girl, as she is an adopted child to her parents. Chandini gets introduced to drugs by Swamy and eventually gets hospitalised. Johnny suffers from weakening eyesight and realizes that he will soon lose his vision completely; because of which he wants to get Bobby married and pleads Chandini's parents for the same. They agree after hearing about his predicament. On the night of the wedding, Bobby is killed by Swamy and his gang. When Johnny learns of his brother's death, he kills Swamy and Didi, the leader of the gang. In the end, Johnny loses his sight completely, meets with an accident and dies.

Cast
 Mammootty as Johny Varghese
 Ranjitha as Mridula, lecturer
 Kamal Gaur as Swamy the drug dada of College
 Jeet Upendra as Bobby Varghese
 Rani (Tamil actress) as Chandini
 Manian Pilla Raju as Professor
 Sankaradi as Principal
 Prem Kumar as Bobby's friend
 Gopal Poojari as Didi
 Thrissur Elsy as Hostel Warden
 Sukumari as Mridula's mother
 Abu Salim
 Augustine as Drug mafia member
 Hakim Rawther as Drug mafia member
 Kuthiravattom Pappu as Priest
 Prem Prakash as Coach Mohana Krishan
 Jagathi Sreekumar as Police Constable
 Soman as Doctor
 T. S. Krishnan as Hassan
 T. P. Madhavan as Chandini's father
 Robin Verghese as Shelly
 Neelakandan Natrajan as Kuttappayi

Music 

The song Shanthamee Ratriyil was choreographed by Prabhudeva , his Malayalam debut.

References

External links

 Kamal Gaur Return to 'M' town at TOI

1990s Malayalam-language films
Films directed by Jayaraj